Marie-Anne Vandermoere (born 10 September 1966) is a Belgian rower. She competed in the women's quadruple sculls event at the 1988 Summer Olympics.

References

External links
 

1966 births
Living people
Belgian female rowers
Olympic rowers of Belgium
Rowers at the 1988 Summer Olympics
Sportspeople from Bruges